Hany Salam is an Egyptian philatelist who was appointed to the Roll of Distinguished Philatelists in 2019. He is a specialist in the postage stamps and postal history of Egypt and has been secretary general of the Philatelic Society of Egypt.

References

External links
http://www.exponet.info/exhibit.php?exhibit_ID=579&lng=EN

Egyptian philatelists
Living people
Signatories to the Roll of Distinguished Philatelists
Year of birth missing (living people)
Philately of Egypt